Gry may refer to:

People
 Gry (given name), a female given name used primarily in Scandinavia, equivalent to the English Dawn
 Gry Bagøien, female singer in the band Gry and now Æter
 Gry Johansen (born 1964), Danish pop singer
 Jørgen Gry (1915–1993), Danish field hockey player who competed in the 1936 Summer Olympics

Other uses 
 Gry (band), a former Danish band
 Barclayville Grebo language
 Glenroy railway station, in Victoria, Australia
 Goraya railway station, in Punjab, India
 -gry puzzle, a word puzzle
 Grímsey Airport, in Iceland